Nina Jeriček (born 10 April 1984) is a Slovenian handballer who plays for RK Krim and the Slovenian national team.

She participated at the 2016 European Women's Handball Championship.

References

1984 births
Living people
Slovenian female handball players
Sportspeople from Celje
Expatriate handball players
Slovenian expatriate sportspeople in France